Stony Pass, elevation , is a mountain pass in the San Juan Mountains of southwest Colorado.

See also
Colorado mountain passes

References

Mountain passes of Colorado
Landforms of San Juan County, Colorado
San Juan Mountains (Colorado)